Uninvited or The Uninvited may refer to:

Film and television
 The Uninvited (1944 film), an American supernatural horror film directed by Lewis Allen
 Uninvited (1987 film), an American science fiction horror film by Greydon Clark
 The Uninvited (1996 film), an American television film directed by Larry Shaw
 Uninvited (1999 film), an Italian thriller directed by Carlo Gabriel Nero
 The Uninvited (2003 film), a South Korean psychological horror film directed by Lee Soo-yeon
 The Uninvited (2008 film), an American horror thriller film by Bob Badway
 The Uninvited (2009 film), an American remake of the 2003 South Korean film A Tale of Two Sisters
 The Uninvited (TV series), a 1997 British science fiction series

Television episodes
 "Uninvited" (Stargate SG-1)
 "The Uninvited" (Powers)
 "The Uninvited" (Thunderbirds)
 "The Uninvited" (The Worst Witch)

Music
 "Uninvited" (song), by Alanis Morissette, 1998; covered by Freemasons, 2007
 The Uninvited (band), an American rock band
 The Uninvited (soundtrack), a soundtrack album from the 2009 film

Other media
 Uninvited (video game), a 1986 point-and-click adventure game
 The Uninvited, a 1997 book by Nick Pope